Ann Kao Hung-an (born 25 January 1984) is a Taiwanese business executive and politician. She earned bachelor's and master's degrees from National Taiwan Normal University and National Taiwan University, respectively, before working as a researcher for the Institute for Information Industry. The institute subsidized Kao's doctoral study at the University of Cincinnati. She then worked for Foxconn until 2020, when she was elected to the Legislative Yuan as a member of the Taiwan People's Party. Partway through her legislative term, Kao was elected Mayor of Hsinchu during the 2022 local election cycle.

Early life and career
Kao was born on 25 January 1984 in Taipei. She completed a bachelor's degree in information and computer education at National Taiwan Normal University before pursuing a master's degree within the Department of Computer Science and Information Engineering at National Taiwan University. Kao's doctoral studies in mechanical engineering, undertaken at the University of Cincinnati, were partially funded by the Institute for Information Industry (III). While working as a researcher for the III, Kao was also a cofounder and part-time employee of Servtech. Immediately prior to running for political office, Kao worked closely with Terry Gou as vice president of Foxconn's Industrial Big Data Office.

Political career

Legislative Yuan
During the 2020 legislative election cycle, Kao ranked third on the Taiwan People's Party list and was elected to the 10th Legislative Yuan via proportional representation. During the campaign period, the Central Election Commission reported that Kao held NT$8.77 million in foreign currency deposits. In February 2020, Kao was appointed head of party affairs in the city of Taichung, and the counties of Changhua and Nantou.

Hsinchu mayoral nomination and election
In July 2022, the Taiwan People's Party nominated Kao as its candidate for the Hsinchu mayoralty. Six candidates contested the office, including major party candidates  of the Kuomintang and the Democratic Progressive Party's . During her mayoral campaign, Mirror Media reported that Kao's doctoral dissertation, authored at the University of Cincinnati, was plagiarized from two studies she had taken part in as a researcher. Both the research and Kao's doctoral study were subsidized by the Institute for Information Industry. She filed a defamation lawsuit against Mirror Media for the publication of the allegations. Institute president Cho Cheng-hung later told the Legislative Yuan that Kao's doctoral thesis had plagiarized 70–80% of the report she had written for the III. On 25 October 2022, the III began legal action against Kao, claiming that she had used copyrighted information in her doctoral thesis.

Separately, Lin Geng-ren accused Kao of violating the Anti-Corruption Act. Lin also claimed that Kao hired her partner Lee Chung-ting and the couple were suspected of payroll deduction fraud. The Ministry of Justice Investigation Bureau duly investigated Kao on these and other charges, including the acceptance of illegal political donations. The day before the 2022 mayoral election, a whistleblower brought attention to an instance of alleged intimidation by a member of Kao's legislative staff toward a former member of the staff. Despite the allegations against Kao, she won the Hsinchu mayoral election, winning 98,121 votes (45%), finishing ahead of Shen (77,764; 35.7%) and Lin (18%). Prior to taking office as mayor, Kao's legislative offices were searched and she was questioned in regards to the allegations against her.

Mayoralty
Upon taking office on 25 December 2022, Kao became the first female elected mayor of Hsinchu, and the youngest female county magistrate or mayor in Taiwanese history. She was replaced as a legislator by Chen Wan-hui.

References

Taiwanese expatriates in the United States
University of Cincinnati alumni
Taiwan People's Party Members of the Legislative Yuan
Politicians of the Republic of China on Taiwan from Taipei
Party List Members of the Legislative Yuan
Living people
1984 births
Taiwanese women business executives
Foxconn people
National Taiwan Normal University alumni
National Taiwan University alumni
Members of the 10th Legislative Yuan
21st-century Taiwanese women politicians
21st-century Taiwanese businesspeople
Businesspeople from Taipei
People involved in plagiarism controversies
Taiwanese women company founders
21st-century businesswomen
Women mayors of places in Taiwan
Mayors of Hsinchu